Marguerite-Louise Virginie Chardon Ancelot (1792–1875) was a French painter, writer and playwright. Ancelot was born to a parliamentary family in Dijon, and was married to playwright Jacques-François Ancelot. From 1824 to 1866 Ancelot hosted a literary salon on Paris's rue de Seine.

Her plays were collected in four volumes and published as Theâtre complet in 1848. She published two memoirs: Les Salons de Paris, foyers éteints (1858) and Un salon de Paris 1824-64 (1866). Her most important novels include Georgine (1855), Une route sans issue (1857), and Un nœud de ruban (1858).

Exhibitions
 La Veuve du Roi Ban and several portraits, Salon of 1814
 Louis XIV, at the death bed of Jacques II, Salon of 1817

Collections
 Musée Carnavalet, Paris : François Ancelot (1794-1854), auteur dramatique, 1819, oil on canvas

References

Bibliography 

 

1792 births
1875 deaths
Artists from Dijon
French women dramatists and playwrights
French women painters
19th-century French painters
19th-century French women artists
19th-century French dramatists and playwrights
19th-century French women writers
French salon-holders
Writers from Dijon